Alicia Kozlowski (born January 12, 1988) is an American politician serving as a member of the Minnesota House of Representatives since 2023. A member of the Minnesota Democratic-Farmer-Labor Party (DFL), Kozlowski represents District 8B in northeastern Minnesota, which includes the city of Duluth and parts of St. Louis County.

Early life, education and career 
Born in Duluth, Minnesota, Kozlowski is of Mexican and Ojibwe descent and is the child of a Fond du Lac Band elder. They earned a Bachelor of Arts degree in history from the University of Minnesota Duluth in 2009 and a Master of Business Administration from the College of St. Scholastica in 2017.

From 2010 to 2015, Kozlowski worked as an administrative assistant and guest services manager at the Simon Property Group. They then worked as a registrar generalist at the College of St. Scholastica. From 2019 to 2021, they served as a community relations officer for the City of Duluth.

Minnesota House of Representatives 
Kozlowski was elected to the Minnesota House of Representatives in November 2022. She first ran after four-term DFL incumbent Jennifer Schultz announced she would not seek reelection and would run for the 8th Congressional District. When they assumed office, Kozlowski became the first non-binary and first two-spirit member of the Minnesota Legislature.

Kozlowski serves on the Capital Investment, Economic Development Finance and Policy, Housing Finance and Policy, and Labor and Industry Finance and Policy Committees.

Personal life 
Kozlowski lives in Duluth, Minnesota with their spouse, Samantha, and has one child. Their Ojibwe name is Ozaawaa Anakwad, which is Yellow Cloud.

References

External links 

 Official House of Representatives website
 Official campaign website

Living people
People from Duluth, Minnesota
Politicians from Duluth, Minnesota
Democratic Party members of the Minnesota House of Representatives
American politicians of Mexican descent
Native American politicians
Non-binary politicians
1988 births
Two-spirit people
University of Minnesota Duluth alumni
LGBT state legislators in Minnesota